Up on the Sun is the third album by the Meat Puppets, released in 1985 by SST Records.  The album features a cleaner and more technical sound with a more psychedelic rock feel, in contrast to the sloppy punk approach of their first album (1982), while continuing with the mystical, poetic lyrics and country-inflected songwriting of Meat Puppets II (1984).

Background

Brothers Curt and Cris Kirkwood were interested in psychedelic rock.  The pair often indulged in recreational drug use with Derrick Bostrom, who came from an affluent, politically liberal family in Arizona and who introduced them to punk rock. During a trip to Los Angeles, the group got into the underground post-punk scene there.  Joe Carducci invited the group to join SST Records, a record label associated with the early hardcore punk scene and home to Black Flag. The Meat Puppets' first EP In a Car (1981) and first seven albums appeared through SST.

Meat Puppets (1981) featured fast-paced thrash punk mixed with psychedelic rock and country laden with guitar feedback and Curt screamed vocals.  The group soon tired of hardcore; Meat Puppets II was slower and more emotional with psychedelic guitar effects and mystical, poetic lyrics by Curt.  The release of Meat Puppets II was delayed until 1984, a peak year for SST which also saw the release of Hüsker Dü's Zen Arcade, Minutemen's Double Nickels on the Dime, and numerous albums by Black Flag who due to legal issues had not been able to release an album since 1981's Damaged.  The Meat Puppets supported Meat Puppets II with a tour along with Black Flag and The Nig-Heist, where the band's long hair and jam-band approach displeased audiences.

Recording and release

As with the band's previous album, recording took place at Total Access Studios in Redondo Beach, California, with production by SST's house engineer Spot.  They recorded from January 26 to 28, 1985, and SST released the album that March.  The lyrics were printed with the liner notes, unbroken into the songs' stanzas.  Curt Kirkwood used a Rockman amplifier to produce a clean guitar sound.  Curt made the painting for the cover: a mug with a picture of a marijuana plant on it.

Rykodisc brought Up on the Sun back into print in 1999, along with the Meat Puppets's six other SST albums.  Bonus tracks on the rerelease include a version of "Hot Pink" that incorporates a lengthy improvised jam.

Music 
Musically, Up on the Sun departed slightly from the country-influenced sound of its immediate predecessor, being more based in what Mark Deming described as "sunburned psychedelia". Jon Dolan called the record an "insanely idyllic" work of "post-punk pastoralism".

Reception and legacy

To reviewer Fayette Hickox the Meat Puppets "deserve a legion" like the Deadheads—the faithful Grateful Dead fans—and the album "incorporate[s] ... seeming contradictions  The band's hardcore past rattles beneath the surface of an almost folksy ingenuousness."  In his Consumer Guide in The Village Voice Robert Christgau gave the album a B+ and wrote, "Curt Kirkwood is the David Thomas of endearing sloppiness. ... Curt's guitars not so much chim[e] as chatter in a nonchalantly unstylish take on neofolk lyricism. ... the music's charms are a little too flaccid to hold up the most unabashedly lysergic worldview yet to emerge from postpunk".  Gregg Turner in a review in Creem denigrated Curt's vocals as "like a sick dog begging for food" and the production for failing to capture the quality of the band's live sound.  He judged the material was "not all that riveting".  A People review called Curt's guitarwork "strikingly inventive and mellifluous" while finding his vocals and the production unimpressive and found the band an acquired taste.

The band toured in support of the album throughout most of 1985, after which they followed up with a six-track EP titled Out My Way in 1986.

Suzanne McElfresh gave the 1999 rerelease a positive review, calling it "more fully realized" than Meat Puppets II.  Mark Deming at AllMusic gave the album 4.5 out of 5 stars and wrote: "The album has an air of carefree drift, but it doesn't meander, and the performances are remarkably tight, full of energy and purpose even when the songs are redolent of goofing off. ... the band rarely sounded as joyous or played with the same fire and accuracy as they demonstrated here, and it's arguably their most purely pleasurable work", though he considered "it lacks a song as memorable as 'Lake of Fire'".

Birdsong Brewing named a beer "Up on the Sun Saison" after the Meat Puppets song.  The Meat Puppets performed Up on the Sun in its entirety at the All Tomorrow's Parties festival that they curated in May 2011.

Analysis

The group members have been open about their fondness for recreational drug use, in particular of LSD, and though the lyrics make no direct references to drugs, Curt Kirkwood has called Up on the Sun the group's "beer and pot" album.  A psychedelic approach permeates the music and lyrics.

Curt had recently become the father of twins and the theme of fatherhood recurs in the lyrics, as in lines such as "You are my daughter" in the lead track.

The lyrics to "Swimming Ground" are more realistic and idyllic than the psychedelic fantasies that precede it; the escape is toward the local swimming ground on hot summer days and the clouds overhead fail to let loose the rain.  The scene recalls the desert summers of the Kirkwoods' Arizona youth.

"Enchanted Pork Fist" is a mostly instrumental track with nonsense lyrics; the opening line "pistachios turn your fingers red" refers to the red with which manufacturers often dye the shells of commercial pistachios.  Matthew Smith-Lahrman interprets this line as suggesting the lasting effects of a drug on the singer.

Curt uses flowing water in "Two Rivers" as a metaphor for different aspects of life, such as relationships and the life's ever-changingness, and how different waters—and aspects of life—constantly flow into each other.  The album closes with "Creator", in which Curt takes a cynical view of religion: "some say openly 'I don't know' / others build elevators / to take the chosen few / who can afford the scenic view".

Track listing

Personnel
Meat Puppets
 Curt Kirkwood – guitar, vocals
 Cris Kirkwood – bass, vocals
 Derrick Bostrom – drums
Technical
 Spot – engineer
 Curt Kirkwood – cover artwork
 Derrick Bostrom – sleeve artwork
 Isaac Betesh – vinyl mastering at Greenhouse Audio

References

Works cited

 
 
 
 
 
 
 
 
 
 
 
 
 
 
 

Meat Puppets albums
1985 albums
SST Records albums
Albums produced by Spot (producer)
Post-punk albums by American artists
Cannabis music